Empresa de Transporte Aéreo del Perú S.A., branded as Aeroperú, was a Peruvian airline, serving as flag carrier of Peru from 1973 to 1999. The company was headquartered in Lima, with the city's Jorge Chávez International Airport serving as its primary hub. Besides an extensive domestic route network, Aeroperú offered international flights to places in Latin America and the United States of America. The company had around 1,500 employees.

History

Aeroperú was formed on May 22, 1973, following the reorganization of SATCO, an earlier airline founded on 1960 and controlled by the Peruvian Army. Initially a wholly state-owned company with a fleet of three Fokker F28 Fellowships taken over from SATCO, revenue flights were commenced in October on the Lima-Cusco route. Soon, a Boeing 727 joined the fleet, and the airline placed an order for two new Fokker F27 Friendships. In 1974, two Douglas DC-8s were acquired from Viasa, which allowed the launch of international routes. The inaugural international flight to Buenos Aires took place on 29 July of that year, soon followed by a scheduled service to Miami. By 1978, the Aeroperú network had grown to include a multitude of destinations in Latin America, and also the US cities of New York and Los Angeles due to their large Latino populations.

In July 1981, Aeroperú was gradually privatized, with the Peruvian government keeping a minority share of 20%. In 1982, plans were made for a merger with Faucett Perú, the other large passenger airline in the country at that time. As a preparatory measure, redundancies in the route networks of the two airlines were removed, so that Aeroperú had to suspend flights to a number of destinations, including Rio de Janeiro, São Paulo, New York City and Los Angeles. No further steps were taken towards merging the two airlines, and so in 1983 flights to several destinations recommenced. A bilateral air traffic agreement between Peru and the United States expired on 11 November 1983. Because of disagreements over the granting of fifth freedom rights, all flights between the two countries were suspended in May 1984 until mid-1985, which affected Aeroperú's Lima-Miami route.

In 1993, Aeroméxico acquired 70% of the shares worth $54 million, thus making Aeroperú its subsidiary. Subsequently, two Boeing 757-200s were transferred, allowing Aeroperú to replace their ageing DC-8s. In 1996, 47% of Aeroperú was transferred to Cintra, the parent company of Aeroméxico and Mexicana de Aviación. In 1998, Delta Air Lines became a major shareholder of Aeroperú, when they acquired a 35 percent stake in the airline. The agreement saw Cintra reducing their share to an equal 35 percent.

Aeroperú was forced to suspend all flight operations on March 10, 1999. According to general director Jaan Albrecht, Aeroperu's debt by 1999 had reached $174 million, while the airline's tangible assets were worth only $50 million. Several plans for a relaunch were made, which included a possible buy-in of Continental Airlines or a takeover by a group of foreign investors. None of these materialized, and Aeroperú was liquidated on August 18, 1999. Most of its route network as well as the role of Peruvian flag carrier was taken over by newly founded LAN Perú.

Destinations

With Jorge Chavez International Airport being its most important hub, Aeroperú maintained an extensive domestic route network. International flights were offered to a number of cities in Latin America, as well as the United States.

Fleet

Over the years, Aeroperú operated the following aircraft types:

Accidents and incidents
 On October 25, 1988, in Aeroperú Flight 772, an Aeroperú Fokker F28 Fellowship (registered OB-R-1020) took off at Inca Manco Cápac International Airport for a domestic flight to Arequipa, but failed to obtain any substantial height. Subsequently, the aircraft hit the ground and broke up into several pieces. Of the 65 passengers on board, 11 were killed, as well as one crew member.
 On October 2, 1996, Aeroperú Flight 603, a Boeing 757-200 (registered N52AW) had been en route from Lima to Santiago de Chile when it crashed into the Pacific Ocean at 01:11 local time. The investigation revealed that during earlier maintenance work, a protective tape covering the static ports of the airplane had not been removed, which resulted in incorrect instrument data being delivered to the pilots during the accident flight. All 70 people on board the aircraft died in the crash.

See also
 List of defunct airlines of Peru

References

External links
 Aeroperú website  
 older Aeroperú domain 
 Evaluacion del Proceso de Privatizacion de las Empresa de Servicios Publicos 1991-2000 

 
Defunct airlines of Peru
Airlines established in 1973
Airlines disestablished in 1999
Defunct companies of Peru
1973 establishments in Peru
1999 disestablishments in South America